Froland Station is a railway station in the village of Froland which lies along the river Nidelva in Froland municipality in Agder county, Norway. Located along the Arendalsbanen railway line, it is served by Go-Ahead Norge. The station was opened in 1908 as part of Arendal–Åmli Line.

References

Railway stations in Agder
Railway stations on the Arendal Line
Railway stations opened in 1908
1908 establishments in Norway
Froland